Orgonon was the  home, laboratory and research center of the Austrian-born psychiatrist Wilhelm Reich (1897–1957).  Located in Rangeley, Maine, it is Reich's burial place, and is open to the public as the Wilhelm Reich Museum.  Its main building, designed by James B. Bell and built for Reich in 1948, is listed on the National Register of Historic Places (as the Orgone Research Laboratory), and is a significant example of International Style architecture in the state.  The name is derived from the hypostatized term "orgone", Reich's principal area of study in his later years.

Facilities
The property includes two major buildings and two cabins.

Orgone Energy Observatory
The main building is the Orgone Energy Observatory, and is where Reich did his research and had his office and library.  It is a fieldstone structure, two stories high, with a flat roof.  The International Style building was designed by New York City architect James B. Bell and completed in 1948.  The roughly-centered entry leads into a hallway, with Reich's laboratory on the right and a suite of rooms on the left that included a kitchen, bathrooms, and playroom for Reich's son.  The upper level, accessed by stairs at the back of the hall, included a bathroom, office, and living quarters.  The walls are finished in knotty pine throughout, with plywood ceilings and vinyl flooring.

Conference Center
The conference center is an L-shaped wood-frame structure, built in 1945 and designated by Reich as the Students' Laboratory.  It has been adapted for use by the museum to house its offices and meeting space.

Cabins
The property includes two cabins, which are seasonally available for rental.  "Bunchberry", the smaller of the two, has two bedrooms, while "Tamarack" has three.  Both have kitchens, and are in secluded settings somewhat apart from the main buildings.  Tamarack was used by the Reichs as a residence, and the doctor stipulated that it should be made available to needy children.  The trust managing the property donates use of this cabin for four weeks every summer to needy families.

See also
National Register of Historic Places listings in Franklin County, Maine

References

External links
Wilhelm Reich Museum home page

Orgonomy
Houses in Franklin County, Maine
Museums in Franklin County, Maine
Biographical museums in Maine
Historic house museums in Maine
Science museums in Maine
Buildings and structures on the National Register of Historic Places in Maine
National Register of Historic Places in Franklin County, Maine